The 2020 South Sydney Rabbitohs season is the 113th in the history of the South Sydney Rabbitohs. Coached by Wayne Bennett and captained by Adam Reynolds, they compete in the National Rugby League's 2020 Telstra Premiership.

Squad movements

Players

Gains

Losses

Re-signings

Coaching staff

Preseason

NRL Nines

Preseason trials

Regular season 
Home games in bold.

Finals

Ladder

Player Statistics 

Source:

Red and Green Ball

Representative honours 

 Bold denotes players who captained their respective teams.
 (ToS) - Train on Squad

References 

2020
South Sydney